The Bosses of the Senate is an American political cartoon by Joseph Keppler, published in the January 23, 1889, issue of Puck magazine. 

The cartoon depicts the United States Senate as a body under the control of "captain of industry" robber barons representing trusts in various industries, who are depicted as obese, domineering, and powerful figures with swollen money bags for bodies, with their nature being juxtaposed with that of the senators of the 50th Congress, who Keppler implies are under the industrialists' control. The cartoon discusses with concern the rise of US industry in the post-Civil War Gilded Age, the expanding influence of monopolies and trusts, and the role of lobbying in American politics. It is generally recognised as an early antitrust cartoon which had played a role in the development of the Sherman Antitrust Act.

According to the United States Senate, it is a "frequently reproduced cartoon, long a staple of textbooks and studies of Congress". NPR has called the cartoon "the defining image of late 19th-century Washington." Historian Josh Brown has stated that it "expresses general public discontent and concern about the growing impact and power of large businesses" and "their control over the political process".

Some contemporary commentators have asserted that such corporate interests still have immense power over lawmakers in modern-day America.

According to BunkHistory, the image is in the public domain.

References 

Political satire
United States Senate